is a Zainichi Korean former professional baseball outfielder. An ethnic Korean, his birth name is Hanja: 周剛史.

On December 2, 2020, he become free agent.

References

External links

 NPB.com

1988 births
Living people
Baseball people from Okayama Prefecture
Nippon Professional Baseball outfielders
South Korean expatriate baseball players in Japan
Tokyo Yakult Swallows players
Zainichi Korean people